The women's high jump at the 2018 IAAF World Indoor Championships took place at Arena Birmingham in Birmingham, United Kingdom, on 1 March 2018.

With the pits back to back in the center of the arena and no events on the track, the Women shared center stage with the Men's high jump.

Summary

She was the strong favourite, having gone unbeaten since 2016 and as the two-time reigning World Champion outdoors. American Vashti Cunningham returned to defend her title and 2017 World runner-up, Yuliya Levchenko of Ukraine, also entered the event.

The overall performance of the field was poor. Seven athletes were eliminated after clearing the opening height of  only. Of the remaining four athletes only Lasitskene had achieved a clean scorecard after three heights. The 20-year-old Cunningham took the silver medal by virtue of having only one failure before that height. Alessia Trost of Italy edged out Great Britain's Morgan Lake on countback to win the bronze medal – her first at senior world level. Lasitskene ended the competition on her own, clearing  before three failed attempts at a personal best and the championship record of Stefka Kostadinova (unbeaten since 1987).

Records

Results
The final was started at 18:45.

References

high jump
High jump at the World Athletics Indoor Championships
2018 in women's athletics